Abul Khair (1929 – 14 December 1971) was a Bengali educator.

Education and career
Khair joined the department of history of the University of Dhaka in 1955 as a lecturer. He did his Ph.D. on foreign policy in the United States as regards the Indian subcontinent from 1937 to 1947. An enthusiastic supporter of the independence movement of Bangladesh, he was an activist inside the university organizing movements for the autonomy of the university and the non-cooperation movement.

Death
Khair was picked up by the Pakistani army sometime in August 1971, together with a few of the other Dhaka University teachers. That time he was released after a month. He stayed back in his university flat from where he was picked up by the Al Badrs on 10 December, never to return. He was murdered. Khair's mutilated body was found gagged and blindfolded with a bedsheet 21 days later at an abandoned brick kiln at Rayer Bazar. It was his wife Sayeda's chador that led to his identity being established. He was buried in the compound of the Dhaka University Central  mosque.

On the same site at Rayer Bazar lay bodies of dozens of other intellectuals killed in the same way.

On 3 November 2013, Chowdhury Mueen-Uddin, a Muslim leader based in London, and Ashrafuz Zaman Khan, based in the US, were sentenced in absentia after the court found that they were involved in the abduction and murders of 18 people—nine Dhaka University teachers (including Dr. Khair), six journalists and three physicians—in December 1971.

Gallery

See also
 1971 Bangladesh atrocities

References

1929 births
1971 deaths
Bangladeshi murder victims
People murdered in Bangladesh
People killed in the Bangladesh Liberation War